Vydubychi is a station of Kyiv Metro's Syretsko-Pecherska Line. It is situated between Druzhby Narodiv and Slavutych stations. This station was opened on 30 December 1991.

Vydubychi station was designed by architects T. Tselikovska.

The station has 2 entrances. One of them is situated in underground passage under the crossing of Saperno-Slobidska street and Naddniprianske shose. Another is situated near the bus station Vydubychi, the Vydubychi railway station of the Kyiv Urban Electric Train and the Vydubychi-Trypilski rail station. The second entrance was built in 2001.

Vydubychi station works from 05:42 to 00:15.

External links 

  Kyivsky Metropoliten - Station description and Photographs
  Metropoliten.kiev.ua - Station description and Photographs

Kyiv Metro stations
Railway stations opened in 1991
1991 establishments in Ukraine